Lars Gulliksson (born 7 June 1967 in Övertorneå) is a saxophonist, composer, and arranger now living in Stockholm, Sweden.

He has performed with many of the most prominent Swedish Jazz musicians as well as many international artists, in the radio, TV and on records. The tenor saxophone is his main instrument, but he is also known as a multi-instrumentalist, playing various woodwinds, in Folk- and World music etc.

Studies at Mannes College of Music in New York (with George Coleman, Ellery Eskelin, Richie Beirach m fl), Malmö Academy of Music etc.
He has received scholarships from the Swedish Arts Grants Committee, the Norrbotten "Rubus Arcticus" Scholarship, among others.

Bandleader for his own groups Lars Gulliksson Quartet & Quintet and Sigmund Freud's Mothers (a k a Swedish Mingus Band).

External links
Lars Gulliksson Official home page

1967 births
Living people
People from Övertorneå Municipality
Swedish jazz musicians
Post-bop saxophonists
Swedish jazz composers
Male jazz composers
21st-century saxophonists
21st-century Swedish male musicians